Frank Russell Parker (July 1, 1939 – September 16, 2018) was an American television actor.

Career
Parker was best known as Shawn Brady, husband to Caroline (Peggy McCay) on Days of Our Lives. He portrayed the character semi-regularly from 1983 to 2008, when he started having health issues and made the decision to leave. In order to write Parker's character out of the show, Days of Our Lives writers had Shawn die in February 2008 after giving up his oxygen mask to save his son, Bo (Peter Reckell), on a sabotaged airplane that was going down. Parker subsequently retired from acting the following month. He also had some small roles in Never Too Young, The Young and the Restless and General Hospital.

Other acting credits include multiple episodes of Lost in Space, Hogan's Heroes, Battlestar Galactica, CHiPs, and Quincy, M.E.

Personal life 
He had three daughters: Candace and twins Lindsay and Danielle. His daughter Candace died in a car accident. He resided in Vacaville, California. On September 16, 2018, Parker died in Vacaville, California, from complications of Parkinson's Disease and dementia.

Filmography

References

External links
 

1939 births
2018 deaths
American male soap opera actors
American male television actors
American male film actors
Male actors from Pennsylvania